Events from the year 1791 in Russia

Incumbents
 Monarch – Catherine II

Events
 Russo-Turkish War (1787–1792) continues
 July 10: Battle of Măcin
 August 11: Battle of Cape Kaliakra

 Kakhovka founded
 Pale of Settlement established
 Zoological Museum of Moscow University founded

Births
 Vladimir Fyodorovich Adlerberg, general
 Sergey Aksakov, writer
 Nikolay Bestuzhev, navy officer, writer, inventor, painter, Decembrist
 Kapiton Pavlov, portrait painter
 Yekaterina Saltykov, courtier
 Pyotr Sokolov (portraitist), portrait painter
 Alexandru Sturdza, diplomat and writer

Deaths
 Prince Alexander of Kartli (1726–1791), Georgian prince
 Yakov Knyazhnin, writer
 Grigory Potemkin (born 1739)
 Potap Kuzmich Zaikov, navigator in Russian America

References

1791 in the Russian Empire
Years of the 18th century in the Russian Empire